Siua Wong (born 4 April 2003) is a Fiji international rugby league footballer who plays as a  forward for the Sydney Roosters in the NRL.

Background
He was born in Middlemore, New Zealand. He is of Tongan & Fijian heritage.

He attended Scots College.

Club career
Wong joined the Sydney Roosters as a 14 year old, progressing through the SG Ball and NSW Cup sides through to the first team squad. 

In 2022 he played for the North Sydney Bears in the New South Wales Cup, scoring 3 tries in 10 appearances.

International career
In October 2022 Wong was named in the Fiji squad for the 2021 Rugby League World Cup.

In October 2022 Wong made his international début for the Fiji Bati side against England.

References

External links
Sydney Roosters profile
Rakaviti profile
Fiji profile

2003 births
Living people
Rugby league players from Auckland
Rugby league second-rows
North Sydney Bears NSW Cup players
New Zealand people of Fijian descent
Fiji national rugby league team players